Alternative financial services in the United States refers to a particular type of financial service, namely subprime or near-prime lending (that is, lending to people with relatively poor credit) by non-bank financial institutions. This branch of the financial services industry is more extensive in the United States than in some other countries, because the major banks in the U.S. are less willing to lend to people with marginal credit ratings than their counterparts in many other countries. Examples of these companies include Springleaf, Duvera Financial, Inc., Lendmark Financial Services, Inc., HSBC Finance, Citigroup, Wells Fargo, and Monterey Financial Services, Inc. The more generic name "consumer finance" is also used, although more properly this term applies to financing for any type of consumer.

History
The consumer finance industry (meaning branch-based subprime lenders) mainly came to fruition in the middle of the twentieth century. At that time, these companies were all stand-alone companies not owned by banks and an alternative to banks. However, at that time, the companies were not focused on subprime lending. Instead, they attempted to lend to everyone who would accept their high rates of interest. There were many reasons why certain people would:
Banks made it difficult to obtain personal credit. Banks did not have the wide variety of programs or aggressive marketing that they do today.
Many people simply didn't like to deal with bank employees and branches, preferring the more relaxed environment of a consumer finance company.
Consumer finance companies focused on lowering the required monthly payment for their customer's debts. For example, a customer could refinance $10,000 worth of auto loan debt at 7 percent interest into a home equity loan at 18 percent interest. Because the auto loan would have to be paid off in 5 years while the home equity loan would have a 20-year repayment plan, the required monthly payments for the customer would be lower even though the customer would pay more over the life of the new loan.
Besides charging a higher interest rate to compensate for their risk, consumer finance companies are usually able to operate successfully because their employees are given more flexibility than banks in structuring loans and in collections. Consumer finance companies may also require far less contingent liabilities than banks.

Consumer demographics
Americans that use non-traditional lenders to meet short-term financial needs include almost ten million households that are unbanked or underbanked, according to a 2004 study prepared for The Fannie Mae Foundation by the Urban Institute Metropolitan Housing and Communities Policy Center, "Alternative Financial Service Providers." The study states that a vast majority of borrowers who utilize small-dollar online loans like payday loans tend to use them for regular, recurring expenses as opposed to unexpected financial emergencies. Many borrowers who take advantage of such subprime lending options tend to have low credit scores or limited credit backgrounds, and a vast majority of those who utilize alternative loans online like payday loans tend earn an annual income of $40,000 or less.

Controversial practices
The more-dubious consumer finance companies are known to engage in the following practices:

Failing to tell people who ask for a loan from the lender that they really have good credit and can get a better deal somewhere else (a subprime loan is usually more expensive than a prime loan). This is one of the primary criticisms of the industry and is implied in many other's critiques. For example, consumer finance companies have been called racist because of branches they might have opened in primarily African American areas. If their customers all had bad credit they would be working in the same way they would elsewhere, but it is implied that they are preying on the communities' lack of knowledge of lower priced alternatives.
Sending live checks through the mail which, when used, become loans. This can trick some people, and the interest rate is usually purposely high (although disclosed).
Charging very high fees on a mortgage refinance.
Offering refinance deals that are worse than the previous loan, usually by showing that the new payment will be lower, but not revealing that the new payment does not include taxes and insurance.
Selling single premium credit insurance, also financing that into the loan
Understating interest rates by exploiting a loophole in the Truth in Lending Act of 1968 which allows auto makers to classify "Finance Charges," i.e. interest, as part of the "Amount Financed," thus reducing or even eliminating finance charges to create "zero percent" loans.

Critics also consider the concept and geographical placement of consumer finance stores as a form of "redlining". This is because the sub prime lenders in poorer communities will often be the only local store, yet will be higher priced.

See also
 Community Financial Services Association of America
 Sarakin
 Underbanked

References

Choe, Christopher (2009), Bringing in the Unbanked off the Fringe: The Bank on San Francisco Model and the Need for Public and Private Partnership, Seattle Journal for Social Justice

Financial services in the United States

id:Pembiayaan konsumen
ja:消費者金融